Cymindis is a genus of ground beetle native to the Palearctic (including Europe), the Near East, and North Africa. It contains the following species:

 Cymindis abbreviata Casey, 1920
 Cymindis abeillei Jeannel, 1942 
 Cymindis accentifera Zoubkoff, 1833 
 Cymindis adusta L.Redtenbacher, 1843
 Cymindis afgana Jedlicka, 1956
 Cymindis akserai Jedlicka, 1961
 Cymindis alluaudi Antoine, 1939
 Cymindis altaica Gebler, 1833
 Cymindis alternans Rambur, 1837
 Cymindis alutacea Wollaston, 1867
 Cymindis americana Dejean, 1826 
 Cymindis amicta Wollaston, 1864
 Cymindis ampliata Casey, 1920
 Cymindis anchomenoides Wollaston, 1867
 Cymindis andreae Menetries, 1832
 Cymindis angularis Gyllenhal, 1810
 Cymindis angustior Kraatz, 1884
 Cymindis antonowi Semenov, 1891
 Cymindis aradensis Kirschenhofer, 1984
 Cymindis arcana Emetz, 1972
 Cymindis arctica Kryzhanovskij & Emetz, 1979
 Cymindis arizonensis Schaeffer, 1910 
 Cymindis arnoldii Kabak, 1999
 Cymindis arnostiana Kaba
 Cymindis asiabadensis Jedlicka, 1961
 Cymindis atripennis Casey, 1920
 Cymindis atrolucens (Casey, 1913)
 Cymindis avenae J. R. Sahlberg, 1908
 Cymindis axillaris (Fabricius, 1794) 
 Cymindis babaulti Andrewes, 1924
 Cymindis balchashica Emetz & Kryzhanovskij, 1973
 Cymindis basipunctata Chaudoir, 1875
 Cymindis bedeli Tschitscherine, 1897
 Cymindis binotata Fischer Von Waldheim, 1820
 Cymindis blanda (Casey, 1913)
 Cymindis borealis Leconte, 1863 
 Cymindis budensis Csiki, 1908
 Cymindis bushirica Jedlicka, 1946
 Cymindis californica G.Horn, 1895 
 Cymindis capito Kryzhanovskij & Emetz, 1973
 Cymindis carnica J. Muller, 1924
 Cymindis caudangula Kabak, 1997
 Cymindis chalcea Bates, 1883
 Cymindis championi Andrewes, 1928
 Cymindis chevrolati (Dejean, 1836)
 Cymindis chodjaii Morvan, 1975
 Cymindis cincta Brulle, 1839
 Cymindis cingulata Dejean, 1825
 Cymindis circapicalis Kabak, 2006
 Cymindis coadunata Dejean, 1825
 Cymindis cobosi Mateu, 1965
 Cymindis collaris Motschulsky, 1844
 Cymindis complanata (Dejean, 1826)
 Cymindis corax Reitter, 1889
 Cymindis cordicollis V. E. Jakovlev, 1887
 Cymindis cribrata Chaudoir, 1875
 Cymindis cribricollis Dejean, 1831 
 Cymindis cylindrica Motschulsky, 1844
 Cymindis dachti Jedlicka, 1968
 Cymindis daimio Bates, 1873
 Cymindis darvazica Kabak, 1999
 Cymindis davatchii Morvan, 1975
 Cymindis decora Fischer Von Waldheim, 1829 
 Cymindis densaticollis Fairmaire, 1889
 Cymindis discoidea Dejean, 1824
 Cymindis discophora Chaudoir, 1873
 Cymindis dohrnii (Wollaston, 1867)
 Cymindis dostojewskii Tschitscherine, 1896
 Cymindis dubia Ballion, 1878
 Cymindis ehlersi Putzeys, 1872
 Cymindis elegans Leconte, 1848
 Cymindis emetzi Mikhailov, 1977
 Cymindis ephippium Escalera, 1914
 Cymindis equestris Gebler, 1825
 Cymindis etrusca Bassi, 1834 
 Cymindis evanescens Casey, 1913
 Cymindis facchinii Kabak, 2006 
 Cymindis faldermanni Gistel, 1838 
 Cymindis favieri Fairmaire, 1859 
 Cymindis fedtschenkoi Tschitscherine, 1896
 Cymindis gansuensis Jedlicka, 1946
 Cymindis ghazniensis Jedlicka, 1967
 Cymindis ghaznii Jedlicka, 1968
 Cymindis glabrella Bates, 1878
 Cymindis glebaina Kabak, 2006 
 Cymindis gottelandi Paulian & Villiars, 1939
 Cymindis gurjevae Kabak, 1999
 Cymindis heydeni Paulino De Oliveira, 1882
 Cymindis hiekei Jedlicka, 1969
 Cymindis hierichontica Reiche & Saulcy, 1855
 Cymindis hingstoni Andrewes, 1930
 Cymindis hookeri Bates, 1875 
 Cymindis humeralis (Geoffroy In Fourcroy, 1785) 
 Cymindis imitatrix Apfelbeck, 1904
 Cymindis impressa Reitter, 1893
 Cymindis interior Lindroth, 1969
 Cymindis intermedia Chaudoir, 1873
 Cymindis jakowlewi Semenov, 1889
 Cymindis kaikanica Kabak, 1999
 Cymindis kalavrytana Reitter, 1884
 Cymindis kasakh Kryzhanovskij & Emetz, 1973
 Cymindis kiritshenkoi Emetz & Kryzhanovskij, 1973
 Cymindis klapperichi Jedlicka, 1956
 Cymindis kocheri Antoine, 1939
 Cymindis kozlovi Kabak, 1999
 Cymindis kricheldorffi Fuente, 1921
 Cymindis kuznetzowi Sundukov, 2001
 Cymindis laferi Sundukov, 1999
 Cymindis larissae Sundukov, 1999
 Cymindis lateralis Fischer Von Waldheim, 1820
 Cymindis laticollis Say, 1830
 Cymindis latiuscula Chaudoir, 1875
 Cymindis leachi Reiche, 1868
 Cymindis limbata Dejean, 1831
 Cymindis lindbergi Mateu, 1956
 Cymindis lineata (Quensel In Schonherr, 1806)
 Cymindis lineola L. Dufour, 1820
 Cymindis longstaffi Andrewes, 1923
 Cymindis macularis Fischer Von Waldheim, 1824
 Cymindis maderae Wollaston, 1857
 Cymindis mannerheimi Gebler, 1843
 Cymindis marginella Brulle, 1839
 Cymindis massageta Emetz, 1972
 Cymindis medvedevi Kryzhanovskij & Emetz, 1973
 Cymindis michailovi Emetz, 1972
 Cymindis miliaris (Fabricius, 1801) 
 Cymindis minuta Kabak & Wrase, 1997
 Cymindis moralesi Mateu, 1979
 Cymindis naxiana Apfelbeck, 1904
 Cymindis neglecta Haldeman, 1843 
 Cymindis nikolajevi Kabak, 1997
 Cymindis nitens Andrewes, 1935
 Cymindis nobilis Andrewes, 1933
 Cymindis obscura Casey, 1920
 Cymindis ogloblini Kabak, 1999
 Cymindis olegiana Kabak, 1999
 Cymindis ornata Fischer Von Waldheim, 1823
 Cymindis oschanini Tschitscherine, 1896
 Cymindis ovipennis Motschulsky, 1844
 Cymindis ovtchinnikovi Kabak, 1999
 Cymindis oxiana Kabak, 1997
 Cymindis paivana Wollaston, 1860
 Cymindis pallescens Jedlicka, 1963
 Cymindis pallidula Chaudoir, 1846
 Cymindis pecirkai Jedlicka, 1946 
 Cymindis pellucida Piochard De La Brulerie, 1875
 Cymindis persica Jedlicka, 1968
 Cymindis petrovitzi Mandl, 1973
 Cymindis picta (Pallas, 1771) 
 Cymindis piffli Jedlicka, 1964
 Cymindis pilosa Say, 1823 
 Cymindis pilosipennis Escalera, 1922
 Cymindis pilosissima Reitter, 1894
 Cymindis pindicola Apfelbeck, 1901
 Cymindis planipennis Leconte, 1863
 Cymindis platicollis (Say, 1823) 
 Cymindis portugalica Jedlicka, 1946
 Cymindis povolnyi Jedlicka, 1967
 Cymindis psammodes Andrewes, 1932
 Cymindis punctifera (Leconte, 1884)
 Cymindis punctigera (Leconte, 1851)
 Cymindis purkynei Jedlicka, 1946
 Cymindis quadrimaculata L. Redtenbacher, 1844
 Cymindis quadrisignata Menetries, 1848
 Cymindis reitteri Liebke, 1927
 Cymindis rhatica Antoine, 1936
 Cymindis rivularis Motschulsky, 1844
 Cymindis rostowtzowi Tschitscherine, 1896 
 Cymindis rubriceps Andrewes, 1934
 Cymindis rufescens Gebler, 1845
 Cymindis ruficollis Gebler, 1845
 Cymindis rufipes Gebler, 1825
 Cymindis rufostigma Hunting, 2013
 Cymindis sabulosa (Motschulsky, 1850) 
 Cymindis scapularis Schaum, 1857
 Cymindis sciakyi Kabak, 2006 
 Cymindis semenowi V.E.Jakovlev, 1890
 Cymindis semisulcata G.Horn, 1881
 Cymindis seriata Hatch, 1953
 Cymindis setifeensis Lucas, 1842
 Cymindis sewertzowi Tschitscherine, 1896
 Cymindis simillima Wollaston, 1865
 Cymindis simplex Zoubkoff, 1833 
 Cymindis singularis Rosenhauer, 1856
 Cymindis solskyi Tschitscherine, 1896
 Cymindis subcarinata Casey, 1920
 Cymindis sulcipennis G.Horn, 1881
 Cymindis suturalis Dejean, 1825
 Cymindis tarbagataica Kabak, 1999
 Cymindis transversa Morvan, 1972
 Cymindis triangularis Reitter, 1897
 Cymindis tschikatunovi Mikhailov, 1977
 Cymindis tshatkalica Kabak, 1999
 Cymindis unicolor Kirby, 1837 
 Cymindis uniseriata Bates, 1884
 Cymindis uyguricus B.Gueorguiev, 2000
 Cymindis vagemaculata Breit, 1914 
 Cymindis vaporariorum (Linnaeus, 1758) 
 Cymindis vartianorum Mandl, 1973
 Cymindis velata (Wollaston, 1865) 
 Cymindis violacea Chaudoir, 1873
 Cymindis walteri Reitter, 1889
 Cymindis wrasei Kabak, 2006
 Cymindis zargoides Wollaston, 1863

References

External links
Cymindis at Fauna Europaea

 
Lebiinae